Mumbathi Barakzai is a town and union council of Bannu District in Khyber Pakhtunkhwa province of Pakistan.
Malik Salim Ur Rehman, nephew of the famous businessman, land-holder, and poet Noor Wali Jan Saqib (a.k.a. Lolai Ustad), is one of the prominent personalities in politics from Mumbati Barakzai.

References

Union councils of Bannu District
Populated places in Bannu District